Calosoma dawsoni is a species of ground beetle in the subfamily of Carabinae. It was described by Dajoz in 1997.

References

dawsoni
Beetles described in 1997